Dual specificity protein phosphatase 16 is an enzyme that in humans is encoded by the DUSP16 gene.

The activation of mitogen-activated protein kinase (MAPK) cascades transduces various extracellular signals to the nucleus to induce gene expression, cell proliferation, differentiation, cell cycle arrest, and apoptosis. For full activation of MAPKs, dual-specificity kinases phosphorylate both threonine and tyrosine residues in MAPK TXY motifs. MKPs are dual-specificity phosphatases that dephosphorylate the TXY motif, thereby negatively regulating MAPK activity.[supplied by OMIM]

Interactions
DUSP16 has been shown to interact with MAPK14 and MAPK8IP1.

References

Further reading

External links 
 PDBe-KB provides an overview of all the structure information available in the PDB for Human Dual specificity protein phosphatase 16

EC 3.1.3